Rajsabha (ne:राजसभा Nepali for "The King's Council") was a constitutional body in the Kingdom of Nepal provisioned by Constitution of  Nepal 1962. It consisted of heads of other constitutional bodies and several members appointed by the king.
 
Rajsabha was replaced by Raj Parishad  by Constitution of  Nepal 1990.

The monarchy in Nepal was abolished on 28 May 2008, and therefore so were the king’s councils.

References

Privy councils
Government of Nepal
Politics of Nepal
Nepalese royalty
2008 disestablishments in Nepal